Cham Kabud or Cham-e Kabud may refer to:
Cham Kabud, Hamadan
Cham Kabud, Abdanan, Ilam Province
Cham Kabud, Shirvan and Chardaval, Ilam Province
Cham Kabud, Harsin, Kermanshah Province
Cham Kabud, Sonqor, Kermanshah Province
Cham Kabud-e Chenar, Kermanshah Province
Cham Kabud, Lorestan
Cham Kabud-e Olya
Cham Kabud-e Vosta
Cham Kabud Rural District